Nymphaea gigantea is a species of aquatic perennial herbaceous plant native to Australia and New Guinea. N. gigantea is a tropical and sub-tropical species that establishes tubers in the muddy bottoms of still waters.

Petals can be seen to be a light purple-blue when they first blossom. As they become mature plants they become a light blue, or can even be white. Due to its blue-white color, it is also known as “Blue Cloud", and typically flowers between the months June and July.

Taxonomy
The species was brought to England by Frederick Strange, where it received notices in newspapers and began to be cultivated by nurseries. William Jackson Hooker gave a description of the new species as Nymphaea gigantea in The Botanical Magazine, with an illustration detailing the flower and sections by Walter Hood Fitch.

Description 
The leaves of the N. gigantea are round and can grow out to 75 cm across and are sinuate and dentate. In botany, this means that their edges are toothed with pointed teeth, about 0.5 cm long. The apex of the lobes are rounded, however, the N. gigantea develop points in the space between the lobes from the rest of the leaf. The flowers are emergent, standing 50 cm above the water, and growing to about 25 cm across, although twelve inches (30 centimeters) has been recorded. These flowers have as many as 51 petals, and 750 stamens  The leaves of N. gigantea lie on the water and are generally thick giving them a leathery feeling but are also brittle. The stigma is very dense with papillae, covering the dorsal surface of the carpels.

Distribution and Habitat 
The seeds of N. gigantea are eaten by the Australians. In Australia, the tubers are collected and roasted by Aboriginal women. The buds and flower stalks are collected and eaten as well.N. gigantea was first introduced in England in1852. Three years later in 1855, Van Houtte fruited the species. Since 1865, N. gigantea has been observed to flower during the summer months in water because that is the optimum condition for the tubers to germinate.

References

gigantea
Flora of Australia
Flora of New Guinea